Tokyo Olympics may refer to:

 1940 Summer Olympics
 1964 Summer Olympics
 2020 Summer Olympics (held in 2021)

See also
 Tokyo bid for the 2016 Summer Olympics
 Tokyo Paralympics (disambiguation)